Martial Biguet (born 11 June 1971) is a Central African Republic sprinter. He competed in the 400 metres at the 1992 Summer Olympics and the 1996 Summer Olympics.

References

1971 births
Living people
Athletes (track and field) at the 1992 Summer Olympics
Athletes (track and field) at the 1996 Summer Olympics
Central African Republic male sprinters
Olympic athletes of the Central African Republic
Place of birth missing (living people)